Madone is a town in the Italian region of Lombardy.

Madone may also refer to several mountains in the Swiss canton of Ticino:

Madone (Locarno), a mountain north of Locarno
Il Madone, a mountain near Airolo
Madone di Càmedo, near Cevio

See also
 Madonna (disambiguation)